Erika Weinthal is an American environmental policy scholar currently the Lee Hill Snowdon Professor of Environmental Policy at Duke University. Her current research is environmentalism and its legal politics.

References

Year of birth missing (living people)
Living people
Duke University faculty
American environmentalists
American women environmentalists
American women academics
21st-century American women